This is a list of Jewish cemeteries in the five boroughs of New York City.  Non-sectarian cemeteries in which Jews are buried are not included in this list.
 Acacia Cemetery, Ozone Park, Queens
 Baron Hirsch Cemetery, Graniteville, Staten Island
 Bayside Cemetery, Ozone Park, Queens
 Beth El Cemetery (New Union Field), Ridgewood, Queens
 Beth Olam Cemetery, Brooklyn and Queens
 First Shearith Israel Graveyard (Chatham Square Cemetery), Chinatown, Manhattan
 Hungarian Union Field Cemetery, Glendale, Queens
 Knollwood Park Cemetery, Ridgewood, Queens
 Linden Hill Cemetery, Ridgewood, Queens
 Machpelah Cemetery, Ridgewood, Queens
 Maimonides Cemetery, Cypress Hills, Brooklyn
 Mokom Sholom, Ozone Park, Queens
 Montefiore Cemetery, Springfield Gardens, Queens
 Mount Carmel Cemetery, Glendale, Queens, New York
 Mount Hebron Cemetery, Flushing, Queens
 Mount Hope Cemetery, Cypress Hills, Brooklyn
 Mount Judah Cemetery, Ridgewood, Queens
 Mount Lebanon Cemetery, Ridgewood, Queens
 Mount Neboh Cemetery, Glendale, Queens
 Mount Richmond Cemetery, Richmondtown, Staten Island (2nd cemetery of the Hebrew Free Burial Association)
 Mount Zion Cemetery (Elmweir), Maspeth, Queens
 New Mount Carmel Cemetery, Glendale, Queens
 Salem Fields Cemetery, Cypress Hills, Brooklyn
 Second Shearith Israel Cemetery, Manhattan
 Silver Lake Cemetery, Sunnyside, Staten Island (1st cemetery of the Hebrew Free Burial Association)
 Third Shearith Israel Cemetery, Manhattan
 Union Field Cemetery, Ridgewood, Queens
 United Hebrew Cemetery, Richmondtown, Staten Island
 Washington Cemetery, Mapleton, Brooklyn

See also
 List of cemeteries in the United States
 List of cemeteries in New York

References

External links
 Inskeep, Carol. The Graveyard Shift – A Family Historian's Guide to New York City Cemeteries. . Ancestry Publishing. Orem, Utah. 2000.

Cemeteries in New York City
New York
New York City, Jewish
New York City-related lists